The 1991 Rugby League Premiership was the 17th end-of-season Rugby League Premiership competition. The winners were Hull FC.

First round

Semi-finals

Final

References

1991 in English rugby league